Ghulami is a 1985 Hindi-language film directed by J.P. Dutta.

Ghulami may also refer to:

Films
 Ghulami (1945 film), a Bollywood film of 1945
 Ghulami (1985 Punjabi film), a Pakistani Punjabi-language British drama film directed by Hasnain
 Ghulami (2015 film) an Indian action film

People
 Najieh Ghulami, a presenter for BBC Persian Television

See also

Ghulam (disambiguation)